August Gyldenstolpe (22 June 1849 – 30 June 1928) is a Swedish politician and diplomat who from 22 December 1904 until 2 August 1905 served as Minister of Foreign Affairs of Sweden.

Early life, education 
August Gyldenstolpe was born on 22 June 1849 in Stochholm. In 1873 he graduated from Uppsala University.

Career 
In 1874, he became an attaché at the Swedish embassy in Copenhagen. In the years 1876-1881 served in the apparatus of the Ministry of Foreign Affairs. In 1881, accompanied a special mission in Karlsruhe. Later he served in the embassy in the United States. In 1886 he became chancellor and head of the department.

In 1889 he became Secretary of the Cabinet. In 1895 he was appointed as acting envoy, and from 1897 to 1899 - Ambassador of the Swedish-Norwegian Union in the Netherlands and Belgium. In 1899-1904 - Ambassador to the Russian Empire.

After the resignation of the Foreign Minister Alfred Lagerheim, who was in conflict with Prime Minister Erik Gustaf Boström on the Norwegian issue, he was appointed Foreign Minister. He retained his position in the office of Johan Ramstedt.

On 2 August 1905 Fredrik Wachtmeister replaced Gyldenstolpe as Minister of Foreign Affairs.

From 1905 until 1918 he served as ambassador to France.

References 

Burials at Norra begravningsplatsen
Swedish Ministers for Foreign Affairs
1849 births
1928 deaths
Ambassadors of Sweden to France
Ambassadors of Sweden to the Russian Empire
Commanders Grand Cross of the Order of the Polar Star
Commanders First Class of the Order of the Polar Star
Knights of the Order of the Polar Star
Knights Grand Cross of the Order of Orange-Nassau
Recipients of the Order of the White Eagle (Russia)
Recipients of the Order of Saint Stanislaus (Russian), 1st class
Recipients of the Order of the Medjidie, 1st class
Grand Officiers of the Légion d'honneur
Commandeurs of the Légion d'honneur
Chevaliers of the Légion d'honneur
Commanders First Class of the Order of the Dannebrog
Knights of the Order of the Dannebrog
Recipients of the Order of the Sacred Treasure, 2nd class
Honorary Knights Grand Cross of the Royal Victorian Order
Swedish diplomats
Independent politicians in Sweden